NGC 1943 is a star cluster in the constellation Mensa.  It was discovered in 1826 by the astronomer James Dunlop with a 23-cm telescope.

Sources

External links
 

1943
Mensa (constellation)
Star clusters
Astronomical objects discovered in 1826